The International Orthoptic Association represents over 20,000 orthoptists, in over 20 countries.

History 

The International Orthoptic Association was formed in 1967 after the first International Orthoptic Congress. The British Orthoptic Association were the founding members.

Registration and licensing 

Orthoptists are required to be licensed by their respective countries. Many countries also require them to undertake continuing professional education.

Professional work 

Orthoptists are part of the eye care professional team. They primarily work alongside ophthalmologists, in the co-management of strabismus and binocular vision disorders, such as amblyopia.

Orthoptists are involved in international research, whilst some are employed (particular in the US and Canada) to teach training ophthalmology residents the practice of standard orthoptic care, vision therapy and ocular sonographer practice.

See also 
 Amblyopia
 Eye care professional
 Eyepatch
 Optometry
 Orthoptist
 Pediatric ophthalmology
 Strabismus
 Vision therapy

References

External links 
 International Orthoptic Association

Health in the London Borough of Islington
International medical and health organizations
International organisations based in London
Ophthalmology organizations
Organisations based in the London Borough of Islington
Organizations established in 1962